Everyman's Price is a 1921 American silent comedy film directed by Burton L. King and starring Grace Darling, Bud Geary and Nita Naldi.

Cast
 Grace Darling as Ethel Armstrong
 E.J. Ratcliffe as 	Henry Armstrong 
 Charles Waldron as 	Bruce Steele
 Bud Geary as Jim Steele
 Nita Naldi

References

Bibliography
 Munden, Kenneth White. The American Film Institute Catalog of Motion Pictures Produced in the United States, Part 1. University of California Press, 1997.

External links
 

1920s American films
1921 films
1921 comedy films
1920s English-language films
American silent feature films
American comedy films
American black-and-white films
Films directed by Burton L. King